Konstantin Aleksandrovich Podkorytov (born 8 February 1986) is a former Russian professional football player.

Club career
He played 3 seasons in the Russian Football National League for FC Kuban Krasnodar and FC Ufa.

External links
 
 

1986 births
People from Neryungrinsky District
Living people
Russian footballers
Association football midfielders
FC Kuban Krasnodar players
FC Mordovia Saransk players
FC Gornyak Uchaly players
FC Tekstilshchik Ivanovo players
FC Ufa players
FC Torpedo Moscow players
FC SKA Rostov-on-Don players
Sportspeople from Sakha